Mineralization in soil science is the decomposition (i.e., oxidation) of the chemical compounds in organic matter, by which the nutrients in those compounds are released in soluble inorganic forms that may be available to plants. 
Mineralization is the opposite of immobilization.

Mineralization increases the bioavailability of the nutrients that were in the decomposing organic compounds, most notably, because of their quantities, nitrogen, phosphorus, and sulfur. Whether the decomposition of an organic compound will result in mineralization or immobilization is dependent on its concentration proportionate to that of the carbon in the organic matter. As a rule of thumb, if the concentration of a specific element exceeds the needs of the decomposer for biosynthesis or storage, then it will mineralize.

Ratio of carbon to nitrogen

Whether nitrogen mineralizes or immobilizes depends on the carbon-to-nitrogen ratio (C:N ratio) of the decomposing organic matter. In general, organic matter contacting soil has too little nitrogen to support the biosynthetic needs of the decomposing soil microbial population. If the C:N ratio of the decomposing organic matter is above circa 30:1 then the decomposing microbes may absorb nitrogen in mineral form as, e. g., ammonium or nitrates. This mineral nitrogen is said to be immobilized. This may reduce the concentration of inorganic nitrogen in the soil and thus the nitrogen is not available to plants.

As carbon dioxide is released during the generation of energy in decomposition, a process called "catabolism", the C:N ratio of the organic matter decreases. When the C:N ratio is less than circa 25:1, further decomposition causes mineralization by the simultaneous release of inorganic nitrogen as ammonium. When the decomposition of organic matter is complete, the mineralized nitrogen therefrom adds to that already present in the soil, and therefore increases the total mineral nitrogen in the soil.

See also
 Carbon cycle
 Decomposition
 Humification
 Humus
 Immobilization (soil science)
 Mineral matter in plants
 Nitrification
 Nitrogen cycle
 Remineralisation
 Soil biology
 Soil chemistry
 Soil science

References

Soil science
Nitrogen